Treis Gefyres meaning 'Three bridges' is a neighborhood in Athens, Greece. It is located in north-west of the centre of Athens, in the point where the railways meets Cephissus river. It borders with Kato Patissia and Peristeri. Its name derived from the bridges that located in this point (the Greek word gefyra means bridge).

Neighbourhoods in Athens